This is a list of flag bearers who have represented Luxembourg at the Olympics.

Flag bearers carry the national flag of their country at the opening ceremony of the Olympic Games.

See also
Luxembourg at the Olympics

References

Luxembourg at the Olympics
Luxembourg
Olympic flagbearers